The Progressive Party was a third party in the United States formed in 1912 by former president Theodore Roosevelt after he lost the presidential nomination of the Republican Party to his former protégé rival, incumbent president William Howard Taft. The new party was known for taking advanced positions on progressive reforms and attracting leading national reformers. The party was also ideologically deeply connected with America's indigenous radical-liberal tradition.

After the party's defeat in the 1912 U.S. presidential election, it went into rapid decline in elections until 1918, disappearing by 1920. The Progressive Party was popularly nicknamed the "Bull Moose Party" when Roosevelt boasted that he felt "strong as a bull moose" after losing the Republican nomination in June 1912 at the Chicago convention.

As a member of the Republican Party, Roosevelt had served as president from 1901 to 1909, becoming increasingly progressive in the later years of his presidency. In the 1908 presidential election, Roosevelt helped ensure that he would be succeeded by Secretary of War Taft. Although Taft entered office determined to advance Roosevelt's Square Deal domestic agenda, he stumbled badly during the Payne–Aldrich Tariff Act debate and the Pinchot–Ballinger controversy. The political fallout of these events divided the Republican Party and alienated Roosevelt from his former friend. Progressive Republican leader Robert M. La Follette had already announced a challenge to Taft for the 1912 Republican nomination, but many of his supporters shifted to Roosevelt after the former president decided to seek a third presidential term, which was permissible under the Constitution prior to the ratification of the Twenty-second Amendment. At the 1912 Republican National Convention, Taft narrowly defeated Roosevelt for the party's presidential nomination. After the convention, Roosevelt, Frank Munsey, George Walbridge Perkins and other progressive Republicans established the Progressive Party and nominated a ticket of Roosevelt and Hiram Johnson of California at the 1912 Progressive National Convention. The new party attracted several Republican officeholders, although nearly all of them remained loyal to the Republican Party—in California, Johnson and the Progressives took control of the Republican Party.

The party's platform built on Roosevelt's Square Deal domestic program and called for several progressive reforms. The platform asserted that "to dissolve the unholy alliance between corrupt business and corrupt politics is the first task of the statesmanship of the day". Proposals on the platform included restrictions on campaign finance contributions, a reduction of the tariff and the establishment of a social insurance system, an eight-hour workday and women's suffrage. The party was split on the regulation of large corporations, with some party members disappointed that the platform did not contain a stronger call for "trust-busting". Party members also had different outlooks on foreign policy, with pacifists like Jane Addams opposing Roosevelt's call for a naval build-up.

In the 1912 election, Roosevelt won 27.4% of the popular vote compared to Taft's 23.2%, making Roosevelt the only third party presidential nominee to finish with a higher share of the popular vote than a major party's presidential nominee. Both Taft and Roosevelt finished behind Democratic nominee Woodrow Wilson, who won 41.8% of the popular vote and the vast majority of the electoral vote. The Progressives elected several Congressional and state legislative candidates, but the election was marked primarily by Democratic gains. The 1916 Progressive National Convention was held in conjunction with the 1916 Republican National Convention in hopes of reunifying the parties with Roosevelt as the presidential nominee of both parties. The Progressive Party collapsed after Roosevelt refused the Progressive nomination and insisted his supporters vote for Charles Evans Hughes, the moderately progressive Republican nominee. Most Progressives joined the Republican Party, but some converted to the Democratic Party and Progressives such as Harold L. Ickes would play a role in President Franklin D. Roosevelt's administration. In 1924, La Follette set up another Progressive Party for his presidential run. A third Progressive Party was set up in 1948 for the presidential campaign of former vice president Henry A. Wallace.

Losing to President Taft 

 
Roosevelt had selected Taft, his Secretary of War, to succeed him as the presidential candidate because he thought Taft closely mirrored his own positions. Taft easily won the 1908 presidential election over William Jennings Bryan. Roosevelt became disappointed by Taft's increasingly conservative policies. Roosevelt was outraged when Taft used the Sherman Anti-Trust Act to sue U.S. Steel for an action that President Roosevelt had explicitly approved. They became openly hostile and Roosevelt decided to seek the presidency in early 1912. Taft was already being challenged by Progressive leader senator Robert La Follette of Wisconsin. Most of La Follette's supporters switched to Roosevelt, leaving the Wisconsin senator embittered.

Nine of the states where progressive elements were strongest had set up preference primaries, which Roosevelt won, but Taft had worked far harder than Roosevelt to control the Republican Party's organizational operations and the mechanism for choosing its presidential nominee, the 1912 Republican National Convention. For example, he bought up the votes of delegates from the Southern states, copying the technique Roosevelt himself used in 1904. The Republican National Convention rejected Roosevelt's protests. Roosevelt and his supporters walked out and the convention re-nominated Taft.

The new party
The next day, Roosevelt supporters met to form a new political party of their own. California Governor Hiram Johnson became its chairman and a new convention was scheduled for August. Most of the funding came from wealthy sponsors. Magazine publisher Frank A. Munsey provided $135,000; and financier George W. Perkins, gave $130,000. Roosevelt's family gave $77,500 and others gave $164,000. The total was nearly $600,000, far less than the major parties.

The leadership of the new party at the level just below Roosevelt included Jane Addams of Hull House, a leader in social work, feminism, and pacifism;  former Senator Albert J. Beveridge of Indiana, a leading advocate of regulating industry.; Gifford Pinchot, a leading environmentalist. and his brother Amos Pinchot, enemy of the trusts.  Publishers represented the Muckraker element exposing corruption in city machines. The included Frank Munsey, and Frank Knox, who was the Republican Vice-Presidential candidate in 1936.}}

To that end, the platform called for:
 Strict limits and disclosure requirements on political campaign contributions
 Registration of lobbyists
 Recording and publication of Congressional committee proceedings

In the social sphere, the platform called for:
 A national health service to include all existing government medical agencies
 Social insurance, to provide for the elderly, the unemployed, and the disabled
 Limiting the ability of judges to order injunctions to limit labor strikes
 A minimum wage law for women
 An eight-hour workday
 A federal securities commission
 Farm relief
 Workers' compensation for work-related injuries
 An inheritance tax

The political reforms proposed included:
 Women's suffrage
 Direct election of senators
 Primary elections for state and federal nominations
 Easier amending of the United States Constitution

The platform also urged states to adopt measures for "direct democracy", including:
 The recall election (citizens may remove an elected official before the end of his term)
 The referendum (citizens may decide on a law by popular vote)
 The initiative (citizens may propose a law by petition and enact it by popular vote)
 Judicial recall (when a court declares a law unconstitutional, the citizens may override that ruling by popular vote)

Besides these measures, the platform called for reductions in the tariff and limitations on naval armaments by international agreement. The platform also vaguely called for the creation of a national health service, making Roosevelt likely the first major politician to call for health care reform.

The biggest controversy at the convention was over the platform section dealing with trusts and monopolies. The convention approved a strong "trust-busting" plank, but Perkins had it replaced with language that spoke only of "strong National regulation" and "permanent active [Federal] supervision" of major corporations. This retreat shocked reformers like Pinchot, who blamed it on Perkins. The result was a deep split in the new party that was never resolved.

The platform in general expressed Roosevelt's "New Nationalism", an extension of his earlier philosophy of the Square Deal. He called for new restraints on the power of federal and state judges along with a strong executive to regulate industry, protect the working classes and carry on great national projects. This New Nationalism was paternalistic, in direct contrast to Wilson's individualistic philosophy of "New Freedom". However, once elected, Wilson's actual program resembled Roosevelt's ideas, apart from the notion of reining in judges.

Roosevelt also favored a vigorous foreign policy, including strong military power. Though the platform called for limiting naval armaments, it also recommended the construction of two new battleships per year, much to the distress of outright pacifists such as Jane Addams.

Elections

1912 

Roosevelt ran a vigorous campaign, but the campaign was short of money as the business interests which had supported Roosevelt in 1904 either backed the other candidates or stayed neutral. Roosevelt was also handicapped because he had already served nearly two full terms as president and thus was challenging the unwritten "no third term" rule.

In the end, Roosevelt fell far short of winning. He drew 4.1 million votes—27%, well behind Wilson's 42%, but ahead of Taft's 23% (6% went to Socialist Eugene Debs). Roosevelt received 88 electoral votes, compared to 435 for Wilson and 8 for Taft. This was nonetheless the best showing by any third party since the modern two-party system was established in 1864. Roosevelt was the only third-party candidate to outpoll a candidate of an established party.

The Republican split was essential to allow Wilson to win the presidency. In addition to Roosevelt's presidential campaign, hundreds of other candidates sought office as Progressives in 1912. 
Twenty-one ran for governor. Over 200 ran for U.S. Representative (the exact number is not clear because there were many Republican-Progressive fusion candidacies and some candidates ran with the labels of ad hoc groups such as "Bull Moose Republicans" or (in Pennsylvania) the "Washington Party".)

On October 14, 1912, while Roosevelt was campaigning in Milwaukee, Wisconsin, an insane man John Flammang Schrank, shot him, but the bullet lodged in his chest only after penetrating both his steel eyeglass case and a 50-page single-folded copy of the speech titled "Progressive Cause Greater Than Any Individual", he was to deliver, carried in his jacket pocket. Schrank was immediately disarmed, captured and might have been lynched had Roosevelt not shouted for Schrank to remain unharmed. Roosevelt assured the crowd he was all right, then ordered police to take charge of Schrank and to make sure no violence was done to him. As an experienced hunter and anatomist, Roosevelt correctly concluded that since he was not coughing blood, the bullet had not reached his lung and he declined suggestions to go to the hospital immediately. Instead, he delivered his scheduled speech with blood seeping into his shirt. He spoke for 90 minutes before completing his speech and accepting medical attention. His opening comments to the gathered crowd were: "Ladies and gentlemen, I don't know whether you fully understand that I have just been shot, but it takes more than that to kill a Bull Moose". Afterwards, probes and an x-ray showed that the bullet had lodged in Roosevelt's chest muscle, but did not penetrate the pleura. Doctors concluded that it would be less dangerous to leave it in place than to attempt to remove it and Roosevelt carried the bullet with him for the rest of his life. In later years, when asked about the bullet inside him, Roosevelt would say: "I do not mind it any more than if it were in my waistcoat pocket".

Both Taft and Democratic nominee Woodrow Wilson suspended their own campaigning until Roosevelt recovered and resumed his. When asked if the shooting would affect his election campaign, he said to the reporter "I'm fit as a bull moose", which inspired the party's emblem. He spent two weeks recuperating before returning to the campaign trail. Despite his tenacity, Roosevelt ultimately lost his bid for reelection.

State and local operations

Ohio
Ohio provided the greatest level of state activity for the new party, as well as the earliest formations. In November 1911, a group of Ohio Republicans endorsed Roosevelt for the party's nomination for president; the endorsers included James R. Garfield and Dan Hanna. This endorsement was made by leaders of President Taft's home state. Roosevelt conspicuously declined to make a statement—requested by Garfield—that he would flatly refuse a nomination. Soon thereafter, Roosevelt said, "I am really sorry for Taft... I am sure he means well, but he means well feebly, and he does not know how! He is utterly unfit for leadership and this is a time when we need leadership." In January 1912, Roosevelt declared "if the people make a draft on me I shall not decline to serve". Later that year, Roosevelt spoke before the Constitutional Convention in Ohio, openly identifying as a progressive and endorsing progressive reforms—even endorsing popular review of state judicial decisions. In reaction to Roosevelt's proposals for popular overrule of court decisions, Taft said, "Such extremists are not progressives—they are political emotionalists or neurotics".

The showdown came in Ohio's primary on May 21, 1912, in Taft's home state. Both the Taft and Roosevelt campaigns worked furiously, and La Follette joined in. Each team sent in big name speakers. Roosevelt's train went 1800 miles back and forth in the one state, where he made 75 speeches.  Taft's train went 3000 miles criss-crossing Ohio and he made over 100 speeches. Roosevelt swept the state, convincing Roosevelt that he should intensify his campaigning, and letting Taft know he should work from the White House not the stump.

November 1912
Most of the Progressive candidates were in New York, Ohio, Indiana, Illinois and Massachusetts. Very few were in the South. In one major state California, the state Republican Party was controlled by Governor Hiram Johnson, a close ally of Roosevelt, He became the vice presidential nominee and the ticket carried California.  Only a third of the states held primaries; elsewhere the state organization chose the delegations to the national convention and they favored Taft. The final credentials of the state delegates at the national convention were determined by the national committee, which was controlled by Taft men.

The Progressive candidates generally got between 10% and 30% of the vote. Nine Progressives were elected to the House and none won governorships.  About 250 Progressives were elected to local offices. In November the Democrats benefitted from the Republican split—very few Democrats voted for the Progressive candidates. They gained many state legislature seats, which gave them 10 additional U.S. Senate seats—they also gained 63 U.S. House seats.

1914 
Despite the second-place finish of 1912, the Progressive Party did not disappear at once. One hundred thirty-eight candidates, including women, ran for the U.S. House as Progressives in 1914 and 5 were elected. However, almost half the candidates failed to get more than 10% of the vote.

Gifford Pinchot placed second in the Senate election in Pennsylvania, gathering 24% of the vote.

Hiram Johnson was denied renomination for governor as a Republican—he ran as a Progressive and was re-elected. Seven other Progressives ran for governor; none got more than 16%. Some state parties remained fairly strong. In Washington, Progressives won a third of the seats in the Washington State Legislature.

1916 

Louisiana businessman John M. Parker ran for governor as a Progressive early in the year as the Republican Party was deeply unpopular in Louisiana. Parker got a respectable 37% of the vote and was the only Progressive to run for governor that year.

Later that year, the party held its second national convention, in conjunction with the Republican National Convention as this was to facilitate a possible reconciliation. Five delegates from each convention met to negotiate and the Progressives wanted reunification with Roosevelt as nominee, which the Republicans adamantly opposed. Meanwhile, Charles Evans Hughes, a moderate Progressive, became the front-runner at the Republican convention. He had been on the Supreme Court in 1912 and thus was completely neutral on the bitter debates that year. The Progressives suggested Hughes as a compromise candidate, then Roosevelt sent a message proposing conservative senator Henry Cabot Lodge. The shocked Progressives immediately nominated Roosevelt again, with Parker as the vice presidential nominee. Roosevelt refused to accept the nomination and endorsed Hughes, who was immediately approved by the Republican convention.

The remnants of the national Progressive party promptly disintegrated. Most Progressives reverted to the Republican Party, including Roosevelt, who stumped for Hughes; and Hiram Johnson, who was elected to the Senate as a Republican. Some leaders, such as Harold Ickes of Chicago, supported Wilson.

1918 
All the remaining Progressives in Congress rejoined the Republican Party, except Whitmell Martin, who became a Democrat. No candidates ran as Progressives for governor, senator or representative.

Later years 
Robert M. La Follette Sr. broke bitterly with Roosevelt in 1912 and ran for president on his own ticket, the 1924 Progressive Party, during the 1924 presidential election.

From 1916 to 1932, the Taft wing controlled the Republican Party and refused to nominate any prominent 1912 Progressives to the Republican national ticket. Finally, Frank Knox was nominated for vice president in 1936.

The relative domination of the Republican Party by conservatives left many former Progressives with no real affiliation until the 1930s, when most joined the New Deal Democratic Party coalition of President Franklin D. Roosevelt.

Electoral history

In congressional elections

In presidential elections

Office holders from the Progressive Party

See also 
 Committee of 48 
 Lincoln–Roosevelt League, the California Progressive Party in the early 1900s
 Populist Party (United States)
 Progressive Party (United States, 1924)
 Progressive Party (United States, 1948)
 California Progressive Party
 Oregon Progressive Party
 Wisconsin Progressive Party
 Minnesota Progressive Party
 Vermont Progressive Party

Footnotes

Further reading 

 Broderick, Francis L. Progressivism at risk: Electing a President in 1912 (Praeger, 1989).
 Chace, James. 1912: Wilson, Roosevelt, Taft & Debs—the Election That Changed the Country (2004).
 Cole, Marena. "A Progressive Conservative": The Roles of George Perkins and Frank Munsey in the Progressive Party Campaign of 1912" (Thesis , Tufts University ProQuest Dissertations Publishing, 2017. 10273522).
 Cowan, Geoffrey. Let the People Rule: Theodore Roosevelt and the Birth of the Presidential Primary (2016).
 Delahaye, Claire. "The New Nationalism and Progressive Issues: The Break with Taft and the 1912 Campaign," in Serge Ricard, ed., A Companion to Theodore Roosevelt (2011) pp. 452–467. online.
 Flehinger, Brett. The 1912 Election and the Power of Progressivism: A Brief History with Documents (Bedford/St. Martin's, 2003). 
 Gable, John A. The Bullmoose Years: Theodore Roosevelt and the Progressive Party. Port Washington, NY: Kennikat Press, 1978.
 Garraty, John A. Right Hand Man: The Life of George W. Perkins, (1960) online
 Goodwin, Doris Kearns. The Bully Pulpit: Theodore Roosevelt, William Howard Taft, and the Golden Age of Journalism (2013)
 Gould, Lewis L. Four hats in the ring: The 1912 election and the birth of modern American politics (University Press of Kansas, 2008).
 Jensen, Richard. "Theodore Roosevelt" in Encyclopedia of Third Parties (ME Sharpe, 2000). pp. 702–707.
 Karlin, Jules A. Joseph M. Dixon of Montana (U of Montana Publications in History, 1974) 1:130-190.
 Kraig, Robert Alexander. "The 1912 Election and the Rhetorical Foundations of the Liberal State". Rhetoric and Public Affairs (2000): 363–395. .
 Lincoln,  A. “Theodore Roosevelt, Hiram Johnson, and the Vice-Presidential Nomination of 1912.” Pacific Historical Review 29#3 (1959), pp. 267–83. online.
 Milkis, Sidney M., and Daniel J. Tichenor. "Direct Democracy' and Social Justice: The Progressive Party Campaign of 1912". Studies in American Political Development 8#2 (1994): 282–340.
 Milkis, Sidney M. Theodore Roosevelt, the Progressive Party, and the Transformation of American Democracy. Lawrence, KS: University Press of Kansas, 2009.
 Mowry, George E. The Era of Theodore Roosevelt and the Birth of Modern America. New York: Harper and Row, 1962, national survey; it is not biographical on Roosevelt online
 Mowry, George E. Theodore Roosevelt and the Progressive Movement. (1946) focus on 1912; online
 Ness, Immanuel, and James Ciment, eds. The Encyclopedia of Third Parties in America (3 vol. 2000).
 Selmi, Patrick. "Jane Addams and the Progressive Party Campaign for President in 1912". Journal of Progressive Human Services 22.2 (2011): 160–190.

State and local studies
 Buenker, John D. Urban Liberalism and Progressive Reform (1973).
 Buenker, John D. The History of Wisconsin, Vol. 4: The Progressive Era, 1893–1914 (1998).
 Deverell, William, and Tom Sitton, eds. California Progressivism Revisited ( Univ of California Press, 1994). online
 Huthmacher, J. Joseph. "Urban Liberalism and the Age of Reform" Mississippi Valley Historical Review 49 (1962): 231–241, ; emphasized urban, ethnic, working class support for reform
 Link, William A. The Paradox of Southern Progressivism, 1880–1930 (1992).
 Maxwell, Robert S. La Follette and the Rise of the Progressives in Wisconsin. Madison, Wis.: State Historical Society of Wisconsin, 1956.
 Mowry, George E. The California Progressives (U of California Press, 1951). online
 Olin, Spencer C. California's Prodigal Sons (Univ of California Press, 1968) online
 Pegram, Thomas R. Partisans and Progressives: Private Interest and Public Policy in Illinois, 1870-1922 (U of Illinois Press, 1992). online
 Recchiuti, John Louis.  Civic Engagement: Social Science and Progressive-Era Reform in New York City (2007).
 Warner, Hoyt Landon. Progressivism in Ohio 1897-1917 (Ohio State UP, 1964)
 Wesser, Robert F. Charles Evans Hughes: politics and reform in New York, 1905–1910 (1967).
 Wright, James. The Progressive Yankees: Republican Reformers in New Hampshire, 1906-1916 (1987).

Primary sources
 "Progressive Party Platform of 1912" online
 DeWitt, Benjamin P. The Progressive Movement: A Non-Partisan, Comprehensive Discussion of Current Tendencies in American Politics (1915).  online
 Pinchot, Amos. What's the Matter with America: The Meaning of the Progressive Movement and the Rise of the New Party. (1912) online
 Pinchot, Amos. History of the Progressive Party, 1912–1916. Introduction by Helene Maxwell Hooker. (New York University Press, 1958) online.
 Roosevelt, Theodore. Bull Moose on the Stump: The 1912 Campaign Speeches of Theodore Roosevelt Ed. Lewis L. Gould. (UP of Kansas, 2008).

External links 

 editorial cartoons 
  TeddyRoosevelt.com: Bull Moose Information 
 1912 platform of the Progressive Party 
 Theodore Roosevelt Speech Edison Recordings Campaign -  1912
 1912 Progressive Party platform at LibriVox (public domain audiobooks)

 
Progressive Era in the United States
Left-wing populism in the United States
Political parties in the United States